Krishna Shrine is a 6,131-foot-elevation summit located in the eastern Grand Canyon, in Coconino County of northern Arizona, US. The landform is attached at the southwest to the Vishnu Temple massif, about 1.0 mi distant. Krishna Shrine is about 3.0 mi south of the Cape Royal overlook, Walhalla Plateau (southeast Kaibab Plateau, North Rim). A twin landform occupies the southeast of Vishnu Temple, the Rama Shrine. Krishna Shrine towers about 4,000 ft above the Colorado River, about 2.0 miles south. Both Shrines, east and west, and Vishnu Temple, center, are at the headwater drainage of Asbestos Canyon. At the southwest of Krishna, on an extending arm of Redwall Limestone is a short unnamed drainage; (at the southwest is Newberry Butte at the Colorado River, and Granite Gorge). The west flank of Krishna Shrine drains into the long southwest-trending Vishnu Canyon and Creek, which comes from Freya Castle and the Walhalla Plateau, South Rim.

Like Rama Shrine (at east), Krishna Shrine is composed of the same geology units: a massif of 4-unit Supai Group, upon the platform of the cliff-former (and platform-former) Redwall Limestone. The upper surface of the landform is triangle-shaped-(northwest), and a small eroded peak-(southeast); the high-point prominence is at the northwest and is a remainder, fractured cliff-peak of the Supai, unit 4, the cliff-forming Esplanade Sandstone famous in the Grand Canyon for forming platforms. (The prominence-platform of Rama Shrine is an extensive Esplanade layer (with slope-former debris of soft Hermit Shale).)

Geology

Closeup photos of Krishna Shrine show the interlayering of the red-orange Supai Group. The Supai Group is on the upper platform of the Redwall Limestone. At Krishna Shrine, the Redwall Limestone cliffs are stained blackish, not red.

References

External links

 Aerial view – (~platform with two prominences); Krishna Shrine, Mountainzone

Grand Canyon
Grand Canyon National Park
Colorado Plateau
Landforms of Coconino County, Arizona
Mountains of Arizona
Mountains of Coconino County, Arizona
North American 1000 m summits